Domingo Tejera (July 22, 1899 in Montevideo- June 30, 1969) was a football player from Uruguay. He was part of the Uruguay team that won the gold medal at the 1928 Summer Olympics, and the 1930 FIFA World Cup held in Uruguay.

Tejera played club football for Montevideo Wanderers. He made over 200 appearances and won the Uruguayan league twice with Montevideo Wanderers. Tejera made 17 appearances for the national team from 1922 to 1932. He won the 1920 South American Championship prior to making his international debut, a tournament in which he was part of the squad but did not featured in any matches.

References

1899 births
Footballers from Montevideo
1930 FIFA World Cup players
1969 deaths
Uruguayan footballers
Uruguay international footballers
Footballers at the 1928 Summer Olympics
Olympic footballers of Uruguay
Olympic gold medalists for Uruguay
FIFA World Cup-winning players
Montevideo Wanderers F.C. players
Olympic medalists in football
Copa América-winning players
Medalists at the 1928 Summer Olympics
Association football defenders